Conta is a surname and may refer to:

 Dennis Conta (born 1940), American politician and consultant
 Giancarlo Conta (born 1949), Italian politician
 Vasile Conta (1845–1882), Romanian philosopher, poet, and politician
 Vladimir Conta (born 1954), Romanian conductor and pianist